Arbuthnott ("mouth of the Buadhnat") is a village and parish in the Howe of the Mearns, a low-lying agricultural district of Aberdeenshire, Scotland. It is located on the B967, east of Fordoun (on the A90) and north-west of Inverbervie (on the A92). The nearest railway station is Laurencekirk.

The most salient feature of the village is the 13th century Parish Church of St Ternan, in which the Missal of Arbuthnott was written. Today the church is part of the combined parish of Arbuthnott, Bervie and Kinneff.

Lewis Grassic Gibbon, an author remembered for his novels about life in the Mearns, grew up at Bloomfield in the parish of Arbuthnott. A small museum in the village is dedicated to him, named the Lewis Grassic Gibbon Centre. This is built as an extension to the village hall, and contains an exhibition about the author and his work. The centre also contains a cafe, and post office facilities.

Arbuthnott House, the seat of the Viscount of Arbuthnott, is near the village.

Prehistory and archaeology
In 2004, CFA Archaeology conducted archaeological investigations next to the village in advance of the construction of the Aberdeen to Lochside natural gas pipeline. There they discovered the remains of four Middle Bronze Age roundhouses, one Iron Age post-built roundhouse with a souterrain entered from the house, and two medieval/post-medieval corn-drying kilns. It is thought that more houses might exist but they were outside the area that would be impacted by the pipeline and so were not excavated.

Arbuthnott House

The existing house incorporates sections of a 13th/14th century castle built by the Arbuthnott family, and was greatly expanded in the 15th century when a courtyard was created at its base. A range was built on the side of the courtyard in the 16th century. In the 1750s the entrance was adjusted and the overall composition remodelled to create a symmetrical arrangement. A fine plaster ceiling of 1685 is one of the more important internal features.

Notable people 
 John Arbuthnot (1667–1735), often known simply as Dr Arbuthnot, Scottish physician, satirist and polymath
 The Most Rev. George Gleig (1753-1840), Primus of the Scottish Episcopal Church 
 The Very Rev. Samuel Trail (1806–1887), minister of the parish 1841–44 and Moderator of the General Assembly in 1874

Listed buildings
 Arbuthnott House - category A
 Arbuthnott House - Doocot - category C(s)
 Arbuthnott House - East Gate - category B
 Arbuthnott House - Garden House - category B
 Arbuthnott House - Ice House - category B
 Arbuthnott House Mains Farm - category B
 Arbuthnott House Sundial - category B
 Arbuthnott House, North Bridge over Arbuthnott Burn - category A
 Arbuthnott Parish Kirk - category A
Source:

See also
 Aber and Inver as place-name elements

Notes

External links

 Catholic Encyclopedia article



Villages in Aberdeenshire
!
Bronze Age sites in Scotland